Dua Tawassul is the name for various supplications in Shia Islam although there exists one more well-known Dua with the same name. This prominent supplication has been written in the book of Bihar al-Anwar. The Shi'ites within Iran recite it altogether in religious places on Tuesday  eves. it can also be recited to bless a community/gathering.

Meaning of Du'a 
Du'a (or supplication) literally means invocation; according to it, the servants of Allah request or call out Allah for their material and spiritual demands or wishes.

Meaning of Tawassul 
Tawassul is regarded among the teachings of Shia Islam and most of Muslims, which means to make to take hold of somebody or something that is in a high rank before Allah, and its purpose is getting near to Him and also granting the requests.

Source of Dua 
Dua Tawassul which is mentioned in Mafatih al-Janan originates from the book of Bihar al-Anwar. Mohammad-Baqer Majlesi mentions that: "I found this dua in an old manuscript which was written by one of our companions, and it is quoted that: Muhammad ibn Babawayh has narrated this dua from Imams, and for whatever request I recited it, it was granted right away."
It is also narrated by Famous Shia Cleric Nasir al-Din al-Tusi, who learned this Dua in dream when he saw Imam Mahdi (A.S).

Text 
A part of dua is as follows:

See also

 Du'a Kumayl
 Du'a Nudba
 Dua Al-Ahd
 Mujeer Du'a
 Du'a Abu Hamza al-Thumali
 Du'a al-Faraj

References 

Salah
Shia Islam
Islamic prayer